Ixora yavitensis is a species of shrub or small tree in the family Rubiaceae. It is native to South America.

References

yavitensis
Trees of Peru